A conversation pit is an architectural feature that incorporates built-in seating into a depressed section of flooring within a larger room.  This area often has a table in the center as well.  The seats typically face each other in a centrally focused fashion, bringing the occupants  closer together than free-standing tables and chairs normally would.  In residential design this proximity facilitates comfortable human conversation, dinner parties, and table top games. Their disadvantages include accidental falls and uncomfortable interactions with those standing above in the main room.

History

The conversation pit was popular from the 1950s to the 1970s, seen across Europe as well as North America.  Modernist architects Eero Saarinen and Alexander Girard used  a conversation pit as the centerpiece of the influential Miller House (1958) in Columbus, Indiana, one of the earliest widely publicized applications of the concept. A red conversation pit (since covered, but recently restored) was later incorporated by Saarinen into the 1962 TWA Flight Center at John F. Kennedy International Airport in New York.  Other influential residential projects include the 1955 Cohen House in Sarasota, Florida, by architect Paul Rudolph, for whom the conversation pit became a signature element, and many of Bruce Goff's houses beginning in the 1920s, including the Adah Robinson house in Tulsa, Oklahoma and the 1965 Nicol House in Kansas City, Missouri.

Many conversation pits have been filled in during renovation to create a uniform floor level. The conversation-pit concept influenced the popularity of the somewhat less radical sunken living room, most familiar from the Dick Van Dyke Show on TV. In the late 1990s conversation pits and sunken living rooms were offered in home plans as a way of creating an informal space within a large space.

Season 5 of Mad Men, released in 2012 and set in 1966, featured a conversation pit in Don Draper's new Manhattan apartment. The show's stylish living room led to a reappreciation of the conversation pit and mid-century modern design in general.

See also
 Inglenook, an intimate space that incorporates a fireplace

References

Rooms
Architectural elements